Hootenanny is an album by the bluegrass band Country Gentlemen, recorded in 1963.

Track listing
 Nine Pound Hammer (Merle Travis)
 Pallet On The Floor (Traditional)
 East Virginia Blues (Traditional)
 Eddie On The Freeway (Adcock)
 500 Miles (Hedy West)
 Knoxville Girl (Traditional)
 Red Wing (Traditional)
 Nearer My God To Thee (Traditional)
 Katy Dear (Traditional)
 You Left Me Alone (Traditional)

Personnel
 Charlie Waller - guitar, vocals
 John Duffey - mandolin, vocals
 Eddie Adcock - banjo, vocals
 Tom Gray - bass, vocals

References

External links
 https://web.archive.org/web/20091215090142/http://www.lpdiscography.com/c/Cgentlemen/cgent.htm

1963 albums
The Country Gentlemen albums